Kebnekaise mountain lodge (Kebnekaise fjällstation), elevation , is situated at the base of Mount Kebnekaise,  west of Nikkaluokta, which in turn is situated  west of Kiruna in Lappland, Sweden. The lodge is owned and managed by the Swedish Tourist Association (STF).

Facilities 

A restaurant serves a set menu, there is a mountaineering shop, a sauna, showers, rooms and a kiosk. The lodge offers guided tours to the summit of Kebnekaise. The ascent takes roughly 4-6 hours. Several other guided tours are also arranged.

The road ends at Nikkaluokta and from there on one has to walk. The walk from Nikkaluokta to Kebnekaise takes approximately 4 h. After  there is a restaurant called "Kaffekåtan" by the lake Ladtjojaure where one can get coffee/tea, hot waffles or a burger made of reindeer. 

It is also possible to take a helicopter from Nikkaluokta to Kebnekaise mountain lodge. The trip takes approximately 10 minutes and costs SEK 850 (ca. $) one way. Another option to shorten the walk is to take the boat across the lake Ladtjojaure. This saves ca  of walking. In the winter (November to May) skiing is the preferred way of getting to the Lodge. Snow mobile rides are synchronized with the buses to Kiruna.

The Swedish Glacier Research body is based in the Tarfala Valley, close to Kebnekaise mountain lodge.

Accommodation 
There are 220 beds at the lodge. Booking in advance is recommended during the summer season. There is plenty of space for tents, although camping is not allowed within  from the buildings. No booking needed.

Maps 
Mountain map BD6, BD8, Högfjällskarta Kebnekaise.

Gallery

External links 

Homepage of the Lodge
Glacier research in the Tarfala Valley
The Swedish Tourist Association

References 

Mountain huts in Sweden
Lodge